America's Ethan Allen is a 1949 picture book biography written by Stewart Holbrook and illustrated by Lynd Ward. The book is a biography of Ethan Allen. The book was a recipient of a 1949 Caldecott Honor for its illustrations.

References

1949 children's books
American picture books
Caldecott Honor-winning works
Houghton Mifflin books